sw̓iw̓s Provincial Park  (formerly Haynes Point Provincial Park) is a provincial park in British Columbia, Canada, located on the west side of Osoyoos Lake in the town of Osoyoos, which is on the Canada-United States border at the southern end of the Okanagan region of British Columbia. Approximately  in size, the park was originally created in 1939. The name was changed from Haynes Point to sw̓iw̓s, the original Okanagan (Syilx'tsn) name for the region, meaning "narrowing of the waters".

Haynes Point and adjacent Haynes Creek were named for John Carmichael Haynes (1831–1888).  Haynes was "an Irishman who came to BC in 1858 and was police officer, customs officer, magistrate, assistant gold commissioner, government agent and county court judge in Similkameen, Osoyoos and Kootenay Districts for many years; member of the legislative council [of the Colony of British Columbia], 1864–66, rancher at Osoyoos, 1866–88, accumulating 22,000 acres. Generally known as Judge Haynes."

Heritage and culture
sw̓iw̓s Provincial Park is an archaeological and cultural heritage site located within the traditional territory of the Osoyoos Indian Band. The Osoyoos Indian Band and BC Parks work in partnership to ensure the long-term protection of the archaeological and cultural heritage resources within the park.

In 2014, ancestral remains dated to approximately 1,224 years ago were unearthed and then reburied in the park, making the remains the oldest on record in the Osoyoos region. Radiocarbon dating of animal materials recovered from an ancient midden provided insights about the diet of Osoyoos Indian Band ancestors who lived in the area 3,265 – 4,475 years ago. Obsidian flakes retrieved from the park were determined to be from Oregon, affirming that travel and trade routes of indigenous people occurred extensively along the Columbia River Basin thousands of years ago before the arrival of European settlers in the area in the 19th century. The Hudson's Bay Fur Brigade Trail also passed through the area nearly two centuries ago.

Flora and fauna
The park protects ecosystems at risk and endangered species, such as peach leaf willow, antelope brush, and desert grasses and wetlands. The marsh area and self-guided interpretive trail are maintained as park features. The park species of concern include the tiger salamander, various rare bats, barn owl, American spadefoot toad and painted turtle. Bullfrogs are considered an invasive species in the park, which is also a habitat for mule deer, American black bear, ospreys, bald eagles, and various other species.

Gallery

References

Provincial parks of British Columbia
Provincial parks in the Okanagan
1939 establishments in British Columbia
Protected areas established in 1939